Mohammad Papi (born April 12, 1998) is an Iranian football player who currently plays for Naft Masjed Soleyman in the Iran Pro League.

He is the younger brother of Hossein Papi; the former Sepahan player.

References

Sepahan S.C. footballers
1998 births
Living people
Iranian footballers
Association football midfielders